Narellan is a suburb of Sydney, New South Wales. Narellan is located 60 kilometres south-west of the Sydney central business district, in the local government area of Camden Council and is part of the Macarthur region.

Narellan is known for its modern shopping centre, Narellan Town Centre, historic St Thomas Chapel, Studley Park House and golf course.

History
The area now known as Narellan was probably originally home to the Tharawal people, based in the Illawarra region, although the Western Sydney-based Darug people and the Southern Highlands-based Gandangara people were also known to have inhabited the greater Camden area. Very early relations with British settlers were cordial but as farmers started clearing and fencing the land affecting food resources in the area, clashes between the groups arose until 1816 when a number of indigenous people were massacred and the remainder retreated from direct conflict with the settlers.

In 1805 wool pioneer John Macarthur was granted 5,000 acres (20 km2) at Cowpastures (now Camden). After the land was cleared, it was used for farming for most of the next 200 years until Sydney's suburban sprawl reached the town of Camden and modern suburbs like Narellan were subdivided into housing blocks.

Narellan Post Office opened on 1 August 1856.

Heritage listings 
Narellan has a number of heritage-listed sites, including:
 Camden Valley Way: Studley Park, Narellan
 Kirkham Lane: Camelot, Kirkham
 Kirkham Lane: Kirkham Stables

Sport and recreation 
Narellan was home to the Oran Park Raceway motor racing circuit, which has been redeveloped into a new residential suburb known as Oran Park Town.

Camden Golf Club is the only golf club in Narellan. Narellan also has a football club known as Narellan Rangers located at Nott Oval.

The Narellan Jets play in the local Macarthur Division Rugby League First Grade competition.

Churches 
 St Thomas' Anglican Church

People

Demographics
In the 2016 Australian Bureau of Statistics Census, the suburb of Narellan had a population of 3,616 people.  Like its neighbouring suburbs, Narellan is predominantly Australian born (84.5%) families with young children (48%) living in detached houses (90.2%). The number of people aged 65 and over (11.2%) is substantially less than the national average (14%).

Notable residents
 Jimmy Sharman, boxing promoter
 James Tyson, wealthy pastoralist

Governance 
Narellan lies in the central ward of Camden Council, currently represented by Fred Anderson, Rob Elliott and Debby Dewbery. It sits within the state electorate of Camden, represented by the Liberal Party's Peter Sidgreaves, and the federal electorate of Hume.

References

External links

  [CC-By-SA]
  [CC-By-SA]

 
Suburbs of Sydney